Mohamed Bahamou (born 26 May 1945) is a Moroccan wrestler. He competed at the 1972 Summer Olympics and the 1976 Summer Olympics.

References

External links
 

1945 births
Living people
Moroccan male sport wrestlers
Olympic wrestlers of Morocco
Wrestlers at the 1972 Summer Olympics
Wrestlers at the 1976 Summer Olympics
Place of birth missing (living people)
20th-century Moroccan people